Shoo or Shōō may refer to:

Arts, entertainment, and media

Literature
Shoo!, a children's book by Michael Rosen

Music
"Shoo", a song by Suicide Dolls from Prayers in Parking Lots
"Shoo", a 2006 song by Mac Hall from Thizziana Stoned & Tha Temple of Shrooms
"Shoo", a 1998 song by The Flip Squad from The Flip Squad All-Star DJs

Companies and organizations
Steve Madden (company), American footwear company (NASDAQ stock symbol SHOO)

Geography
 Shōō, Okayama (勝央 Shouou), a Japanese town

History
 Shōō (Kamakura period) (正応 Shouou), a Japanese era name (1288–1293)
 Shoo, an alternative name for Jōō (Edo period), a Japanese era name (1652–1655)

People
 Shoo (singer), also known as Yoo Soo-Young, a member of K-Pop girl group S.E.S.

See also

Scram (disambiguation)
"Shoo Be Doo" (The Cars song), a 1979 single by The Cars
"Shoo Be Doo", a 2007 song by Macy Gray
"Shoo Fly, Don't Bother Me", a popular song from 1869
"Shoo Shoo Baby" (song), a popular song made famous by The Andrews Sisters in 1943
"Shoo-Be-Doo-Be-Doo-Da-Day", a 1968 single by Stevie Wonder
Shu (disambiguation)